In Jainism, Pratima is a step or a stage marking the spiritual rise of a lay person (shravak). There are eleven such steps called pratima. After passing the eleven steps, one is no longer a sravaka, but a muni (monk).

Rules prescribed for laymen are divided into twelve vrata (vows) and eleven pratimas (steps) and are described in several codes of conduct (shravakacharas).

The pratimas are mentioned in several ancient texts like Ratnakaranda Shravakachara (2nd century A.D.).

Twelve vows 

The twelve vows are:

Eleven Pratima 
The eleven stages (pratima) are:
Darshan Pratima (Right perspective): The worship of the true God (i.e., tirthanhara,) guru (preceptor) and shastra (Scripture), and the avoidance of gambling, meat-eating, drinking (wine), adultery, hunting, thieving and debauchery.
Vrat Pratima: The keeping of the twelve vows and the vow to observe sallekhana (at the end of one's life)
Samayak Pratima (Periodic meditation): Engaging in meditation or worship on a regular basis. 
Proshadhopvas Pratima (periodic fasting): fasting four times in a month.
Sachitta Tyaga Pratima: not eating vegetables having the capacity to grow again.
Ratribhukti Tyaga Pratima (or Diva Maithun Tyaga Pratima): Giving up eating during the night or coitus during the day.
Brahmacharya Pratima (celibacy): abstaining from sex or related activity.
Arambha Tyaga Pratima (giving up occupations): refraining from any activity to earn a living.
Parigraha Tyaga Pratima (giving up possessions): detachment from most possessions.
Anurnati Tyaga Pratima (giving up right to give permissions): refraining from giving orders or expressing consents in the family.
Uddishta Tyaga Pratima: The complete renunciation of the householder’s life, retiring into a forest and adopting the rules laid down for the guidance of monks.

Ashadhara in his Sagara-Dharmammrata (13th century) has groups the 11 steps into three ranks.

Grahin (jaghanya: first to sixth pratima)
Varnin (madhyama: seventh to ninth pratima): At this point the householder is termed a Varni. 
Bhikshuka (uttama: tenth and eleventh pratima): At this point a person depends on others for daily survival.

Those who have ascended to the eleventh pratima are termed Kshullaka (with two articles of clothing) and Ailaka (with only one piece of cloth) in the Digambara tradition. The eleventh pratima is termed Shramanabhuta Pratima (being almost like a Shramana) in the Svetambara tradition. The next step is that of a full Jain Muni.

References

Citations

Sources 

 

Jain philosophical concepts